George Alexander Dissanaike (1927–2008), also known as "GAD", was an Emeritus Professor of Physics at the University of Peradeniya, Sri Lanka. He was also a Fellow of the National Academy of Sciences, and a former President of the Institute of Physics.

He received his primary and secondary education at Richmond College, Galle, and St. Peter’s College, Colombo. In 1945, he entered the University of Ceylon, Colombo, and graduated with a BSc degree in Physics in 1949. He was awarded the Government University Science Scholarship for postgraduate studies. He obtained his PhD from Cambridge University in 1953. He was a research student in experimental nuclear physics at the Cavendish Laboratory and a member of Downing College, Cambridge.

References

Alumni of the University of Ceylon
Alumni of Downing College, Cambridge
2008 deaths
1927 births
Alumni of Richmond College, Galle
Academic staff of the University of Peradeniya
Alumni of St. Peter's College, Colombo
Sri Lankan academics
Academics from Galle
People from Galle